The Szarvas inscription refers to the inscription on a bone needle case found near Szarvas in southeastern Hungary and dating from the second half of the 8th century, the "Late Avar" period (700-791).

The needle case and its inscription

The name of the script of the Szarvas inscription
The Hungarian archeologist, historian and linguist Gábor Vékony named the script used on the needle case as "Kárpát-medencei rovásírás" ("Carpathian Basin Rovas script"). He often used this term in his book, A székely írás emlékei, kapcsolatai, története, e.g. in the chapter "A kárpát-medencei rovásábécé korabeli feljegyzése" ("The contemporary record of the Carpathian Basin Rovas alphabet").

Vékony analysed the similarities and the differences between the Old Hungarian and the Carpathian Basin scripts on page 154 of his book. On page 232, Vékony wrote: "- Aethicus Ister jelei azonosak az egykori Kárpát-medencei rovásírás jeleivel." ("The symbols of Aethicus Ister are identical to the symbols of the quondam Carpathian Basin script").

Vékony also writes : "E jel a Szarvason azonosított Kárpát-medencei f alig torzult megfelelője..." ("This symbol is identical to the Carpathian Basin 'f' identified in Szarvas". (referring to the bone needle case found in Szarvas)

In page 233, Vékony writes: "Erre utalhat az is, hogy ez a betűalak levezethető egy párthus alep formából. Feltehető tehát ennek a jelnek a megléte a Kárpát-medencei rovásírásban is (a székelybe is innen származhatott)." ("This could imply also that this glyph can be derived from the Parthian Aleph form. Consequently, the existence of this symbol can be supposed in the Carpathian Basin script as well (it could originate from this to the Székely)." Here the 'Szekely' refers to the Szekely-Hungarian Rovas script also known as Old Hungarian script. Vékony's writing suggests a proposal that a Carpathian Basin Rovas script may be one of the ancestors of the Szekely-Hungarian Rovas script.

The meaning of the inscription 
Gábor Vékony's transcription was improved by linguist Erzsébet Zelliger.  The last character of the fourth row of the inscription was reconstructed by Vékony. The edges of the bone needle case are worn, and the top and bottom edges for part of the characters are not clearly visible.

Transcription with IPA notation
The following transcription using the International Phonetic Alphabet is based on Vékony's original transcription. Superscript segments and those in brackets are reconstructed.

In the inscription, the third symbol of the third row (from left) could be considered a descendant of the ideograms in Turkic languages. However, their possible relationship needs further evidence.

Transcription with Hungarian phonetic notation
{| class="wikitable wide"  border="1" cellpadding="10" cellspacing="1"
! No. of row ||Transcription (using Hungarian phonetic notation)||Translating from Ancient Hungarian (modern meaning)
|- align="center"
|1st||/üngür : ⁱsznek im ⁱly : βᵃsᵘ/||Here is an iron [needle] against demon Üngür;
|- align="center"
|2nd||/[t]ⁱɣ tëβᵉdγën : ⁱszën : tⁱɣ tⁱɣ szᵘr bëk βᵒrɣ/||[Needle should be pricked into the demon; needle, needle, stab, poke, sew-[in]!
|- align="center"
|3rd||/fᵉsᵉsz : ᵉlëi szɜl [...]/||[Who] unstitches [...];
|- align="center"
|4th||/üngür në : adɣᵒn : [ɜzdɣ] imëszd ëɣt en : istᵉnᵉ[m]/||Üngür shall not give [curse]; [...], blast him, my God!’'
|}

Critics and alternative theories
Vékony had read the Szarvas transcription as Hungarian, thus proposing it as evidence that the Hungarian-speaking people had appeared in the region by the 7th century. There are several critics of Vékony's theories and translations, most notably the Hungarian linguist and historian, András Róna-Tas. The debates were summarized by István Riba in 1999 and 2000: "many find themselves unable to accept Vékony's theory".Riba, István (2000). "Reading the Runes: Evidence of the Dual Conquest?" . The Hungarian Quarterly. Vol. XLI. No. 157, Spring 2000

The key point of the critics has been that in traditional Hungarian scholarship, the existence of the Hungarian-speaking population dates from 896 (when the Magyars took over the Carpathian Basin ), while the Szarvas needle case dates from the 8th century. Consequently, either the Szarvas inscription is not in Hungarian or Hungarians were in the Carpathian Basin much earlier than the late 9th century. Róna-Tas attempted to read the Szarvas relic in Turkic instead of Hungarian, but wrote that his transcription needed further improvement. The issue remains an open question amongst Hungarian scholars.

See also
The Alsószentmihály inscription on a building stone found in Mihai Viteazu, Cluj (Transylvania, today Romania).

Notes

References
 Juhász, Irén (1983): Ein Avarenzeitlicher Nadelbehälter mit Kerbschrift aus Szarvas. In: Acta Acheologica 35 (1983), p. 34
 Juhász, Irén (1985): A szarvasi avar rovásírásos tűtartó [The Avar need-case of Szarvas with Rovas script]. Magyar Tudomány [Journal of the Hungarian Science], 85:2, pp. 92–95 
 Kristó, Gyula & Makk, Ferenc (2001): A kilencedik és a tizedik század története [The history of the 9th and the 10th centuries]. In: Magyar Századok [Hungarian Centuries]. Published by Pannonica Kiadó, Ser. ed.: Gyula Szvák, 222 p.  
 Riba,István: Jöttek, honfoglaltak, fújtak. Régészvita egy rovásírásról [Came, settled, blown. Archaeological debate about the runic writing]. In: Heti Világgazdaság [Weekly Word's Economy], Vol. 21. 1999. N. 46. pp. 101–102, 105;   
 Róna-Tas, András (1999). Hungarians and Europe in the early Middle Ages: An introduction to early Hungarian history. Central European University Press. 
 Róna-Tas, András (1996). "The Migration and Landtaking of the Magyars", The Hungarian Quarterly''. Vol. XXXVII, No. 144, Winter 1996, pp. 37–41
 Vékony, Gábor (1985): Késő népvándorláskori rovásfeliratok [Runic inscriptions from the Late Migration Period]. In: Életünk Vol. XXII, No. 1, pp. 71–84 
 Vékony, Gábor (1987): Későnépvándorláskori rovásfeliratok a Kárpát-medencében [Runic inscriptions from the Late Migration Period in the Carpathian Basin]. Szombathely-Budapest: Életünk szerkesztősége.  
 Vékony Gábor (2004): A székely írás emlékei, kapcsolatai, története. Budapest: Nap Kiadó.

Further reading
 Gábor Hosszú (2011): Heritage of Scribes. The Relation of Rovas Scripts to Eurasian Writing Systems.  First edition. Budapest: Rovas Foundation,

External links 
 The Szarvas Rovas inscription on the RovasPedia
 Jenő Demeczky, Dr. Gábor Hosszú, Tamás Rumi, László Sípos, Dr. Erzsébet Zelliger: Revised proposal for encoding the Rovas in the UCS. Individual Contribution for consideration by UTC and ISO/IEC JTC1/SC2/WG2, 14. October 2012. 
 Rovás Info News Portal
 Rovas Foundation: Code request for the Rovas script in ISO 15924 (2012-10-20) 
 Jenő Demeczky, György Giczi, Dr. Gábor Hosszú, Gergely Kliha, Dr. Borbála Obrusánszky, Tamás Rumi, László Sípos, Dr. Erzsébet Zelliger: Additional information about the name of the Rovas script. Individual Contribution for consideration by UTC and ISO/IEC JTC1/SC2/WG2, 2012-10-21.
 Jenő Demeczky, György Giczi, Gábor Hosszú, Gergely Kliha, Borbála Obrusánszky, Tamás Rumi, László Sípos, Erzsébet Zelliger: About the consensus of the Rovas encoding - Response to N4373 (Resolutions of the 8th Hungarian World Congress on the encoding of Old Hungarian). Individual Contribution for consideration by UTC and ISO/IEC JTC1/SC2/WG2. Registered by UTC (L2/12-337), 2012-10-24

8th-century inscriptions
History of the Hungarians
Writing systems
Rovas script